"I've fallen, and I can't get up!" is a catchphrase of the late 1980s and early 1990s popular culture based upon a line from a United States-based television commercial.

Origins
This line was spoken by actress Dorothy McHugh in a television commercial for a medical alarm and protection company called LifeCall.  The motivation behind the systems is that subscribers, mostly seniors as well as disabled people, would receive a pendant which, when activated, would allow the user to speak into an audio receiving device and talk directly with a dispatch service, without the need to reach a telephone.  The service was designed to appeal particularly to seniors who lived alone and who might experience a medical emergency, such as a fall, which would leave them alert but immobile and unable to reach the telephone.

In 1989, LifeCall began running commercials that contained a scene wherein an elderly woman, identified by a dispatcher as "Mrs. Fletcher", uses the medical alert pendant after having fallen in the bathroom.  After falling, Mrs. Fletcher speaks the phrase "I've fallen, and I can't get up!", after which the dispatcher informs her that he is sending help.

Edith Fore (née Edith Americus DeVirgilis; 1916–1997) portrayed Mrs. Fletcher. Although a stuntperson performed the fall itself, Fore said that she created the "I've fallen" line while discussing the accident with LifeCall.

Legacy
By 1990, the Phoenix New Times reported that "From coast to coast, from playground to barroom, an enfeebled whine rings out across the land. All together now: 'I've fallen . . . and I can't get up!'" The catchphrase appeared on t-shirts, novelty records, and in standup comedy. In 1992, a sample of the catchphrase was featured in parody artist "Weird Al" Yankovic's song "I Can't Watch This" (a parody of M.C. Hammer's "U Can't Touch This"). The phrase was parodied in several television shows including The Golden Girls, Family Matters, Roseanne, and The Fresh Prince of Bel-Air.  In 1993, Gary Larson drew a Far Side cartoon featuring the "I've fallen, and I can't get up" building. A sample of the phrase was also featured in a track used only in the Japanese Sega Saturn version of Fighting Vipers when the player is in the training stage.

The 2017 Blue Sky Studios movie Ferdinand spoofed the quote as "I've fallen, and I can't giddyup!", said by Hans.

Trademark
According to the United States Patent and Trademark Office, after first applying in October 1990, LifeCall registered the phrase "I've fallen, and I can't get up" as a trademark in September 1992 until its status was cancelled in 1999 (LifeCall went out of business in 1993). In October 2002, the similar phrase "Help! I've fallen, and I can't get up!" became a registered trademark of Life Alert Emergency Response, Inc. The registration was cancelled in May 2013. A new registration was granted in May 2014. Life Alert had filed for the phrase "Help, I've fallen & can't get up!" in March 2001, but the application was abandoned in November 2001. In June 2007, the phrase "I've fallen, and I can't get up!" also became a registered trademark of Life Alert. Both phrases are currently used on their website as well as in their commercials.

See also
 Medical alarm

References

External links
 LifeCall commercial at RetroJunk

1989 in the United States
Advertising campaigns
American advertising slogans
Catchphrases
American television commercials
1980s television commercials
1990s television commercials
1989 neologisms
Quotations from television